The Kid from Cleveland is a 1949 sports drama film starring George Brent, Lynn Bari and Russ Tamblyn, directed by Herbert Kline, and released by Republic Pictures.

The real-life Indians had just won the 1948 World Series, and many of the team's players made appearances in the film, as well as owner Bill Veeck, co-owner and former Major League Baseball star Hank Greenberg, and then current coach and Baseball Hall-of-Famer Tris Speaker. Also featured were the team's then current and former ballparks, Cleveland Municipal Stadium and League Park. Several Cleveland Indians and Boston Braves players also appear in the film in archive baseball footage segments from the 1948 World Series. Footage of football of the Cleveland Browns and hockey of the Cleveland Barons is also featured.

Synopsis
A troubled teenaged fan is helped by his favorite baseball team, the Cleveland Indians. The kid attracts the attention of sportscaster Mike Jackson alongside Bill Veeck and Hank Greenberg, who spot him on the field imitating a baseball game after he sneaks into Cleveland Stadium on the eve of Game 5 of the World Series. A curious case of truths and lies follow after the sportscaster takes the kid to his home after he told him that he was an orphan, with the first being that he actually has a stepfather in Carl Novak, one who berates him for his running away stunt, which only helps to make Johnny seep into a life of lying and stealing. Johnny even runs away to the spring training camp of the Indians and says that Carl hit him, which leads to his assistant batboy job going away when Mike tells Carl where Johnny is. A friend lures Johnny into helping to steal a car, but a police raid and a near-stabbing stopped by Johnny leads to leniency in juvenile hall. The Indians are pulled into it when Mike tries to adopt Johnny and has the players act as Johnny's godfathers. The nature of Johnny's problem with his stepfather is revealed to involve his mother having locked away the belongings of Johnny's father in a footlocker after he died right before telling him about her new husband, which led to an antagonism between the two. The Novaks keep custody of their child to the approval of Mike. Johnny makes up with Carl, who had secretly been saving money to go to architectural school, just as his father had studied at when he was a boy.

Cast
George Brent as Mike Jackson
Lynn Bari as Katherine Jackson
Rusty Tamblyn as Johnny Barrows
Tommy Cook as Dan "The Kid" Hudson
Ann Doran as Emily Barrows Novak
Louis Jean Heydt as Carl Novak
K. Elmo Lowe as Dave Joyce/Jake Dawson
John Beradino as Mac, the Fence

Cleveland Indians in the cast
as themselves:
Bill Veeck (Owner and President)
Lou Boudreau
Tris Speaker
Hank Greenberg
Bob Feller
Gene Bearden
Satchel Paige
Bob Lemon
Steve Gromek
Joe Gordon
Mickey Vernon
Ken Keltner
Ray Boone
Dale Mitchell
Larry Doby
Bob Kennedy
Jim Hegan

Uncredited Cleveland Indians in the cast
(as themselves)
Bobby Ávila
Al Benton
Allie Clark
Mike Garcia
Mel Harder
Bill McKechnie
Frank Papish
Hal Peck
Mike Tresh
Thurman Tucker
Early Wynn
Sam Zoldak

Baseball umpires (special thanks given in the credits)
Bill Grieve
Bill Summers

External links
 

1949 films
1940s sports drama films
American baseball films
American sports drama films
American black-and-white films
Cleveland Indians
Films scored by Nathan Scott
Films set in Cleveland
Films shot in Cleveland
Republic Pictures films
Sports films based on actual events
1949 drama films
1940s English-language films
Films directed by Herbert Kline
1940s American films